Charlie, Trevor and a Girl Savannah is a 2015 American crime thriller film written and directed by and starring Ty Hodges.

Cast
 Ty Hodges as Charlie
 Eric Roberts as Dr. McMillan
 Toby Hemingway as Trevor
 Emily Meade as Savannah
 Brendan Dooling as "June Bug"

Release
The film premiered at Arena Cinema in Los Angeles on June 19, 2015.

References

External links
 
 

American crime thriller films
2015 crime thriller films
2010s English-language films
2010s American films